Toxolasma is a genus of freshwater mussels, aquatic bivalve mollusks in the family Unionidae, the river mussels.

Species within the genus Toxolasma
 Toxolasma corvuncvulus (southern purple lilliput)
 Toxolasma cylindrellus (pale lilliput)
 Toxolasma lividus (purple lilliput)
 Toxolasma mearnsi (western lilliput)
 Toxolasma parvus (lilliput)
 Toxolasma paulus (iridescent lilliput)
 Toxolasma pullus (Savannah lilliput)
 Toxolasma texasiensis (Texas lilliput)

 
Bivalve genera
Taxonomy articles created by Polbot